Mount Sterling is a city in and the county seat of Brown County, Illinois, United States. The population was 2,006 at the 2020 census.

Foodservice distributor Dot Foods is based in Mount Sterling.

History
Mount Sterling was organized in 1854. It did not have a courthouse until 1868, although it was designated the county seat from when the county was organized.

Geography

Demographics

As of the 2020 census there were 2,006 people, 956 households, and 481 families residing in the city. The racial makeup of the city was 93.47% White, 1.25% African American, 0.25% Native American, 0.25% Asian, 0.30% from other races, and 4.49% from two or more races. Hispanic or Latino people of any race were 1.55% of the population.

There were 956 households, out of which 59.31% had children under the age of 18 living with them, 35.46% were married couples living together, 13.60% had a female householder with no husband present, and 49.69% were non-families. 42.26% of all households were made up of individuals, and 14.12% had someone living alone who was 65 years of age or older. The average household size was 3.16 and the average family size was 2.24.

The city's age distribution consisted of 27.8% under the age of 18, 7.6% from 18 to 24, 28.1% from 25 to 44, 22.3% from 45 to 64, and 14.2% who were 65 years of age or older. The median age was 35.0 years. For every 100 females, there were 106.7 males. For every 100 females age 18 and over, there were 86.0 males.

The median income for a household in the city was $45,536, and the median income for a family was $73,693. Males had a median income of $43,019 versus $31,469 for females. The per capita income for the city was $24,433. About 6.4% of families and 12.8% of the population were below the poverty line, including 12.6% of those under age 18 and 7.0% of those age 65 or over.

Education
Mount Sterling is home to Brown County School District #1, which contains an elementary school, middle school, and high school. The sports teams for the district are referred to as the "Hornets".

References

External links
City of Mt. Sterling official website

Cities in Brown County, Illinois
Cities in Illinois
County seats in Illinois
1854 establishments in Illinois
Populated places established in 1854